Pentyl propanoate (also known as amyl propionate) is an organic ester formed by the condensation of pentan-1-ol and propanoic acid.  It is a colorless liquid with an apple-like odor, that floats on water.

References

External links

Propionate esters